The Southampton Passion was a passion play about the last few days of the life of Jesus. It took place in Guildhall Square, at the heart of the Cultural Quarter of Southampton, against the backdrop of the Southampton Guildhall.

The event took place on Good Friday, 22 April 2011 to an estimated crowd of 10,000. More than 70 actors and a 100-strong choir performed in the play, written and organised by Neil Maddock who has also been cast in the leading role of 33-year-old Jesus.

The performance is produced by e-quip Community Arts Project.

Music 
The play featured original songs and underscore by composer Nathan Hattersley.

Original Cast Recording
The Southampton Passion Original Cast Recording is a cast recording of the songs as performed by the original cast members and 100-piece choir.

Original cast

Trivia 
Act III, Scene 3 was not acted live; a pre-recorded scene was to be shown on video screens but was not due to technical issues, though the sound was played. It was filmed at Wolvesey Palace, which is the residence of the Bishop of Winchester. The scene, set in Pilate's palace, depicts Joseph of Arimathea requesting of Pilate the body of Jesus.

References

External links 
 e-Quip Community Arts Project website 

Musicals based on the Gospels
Passion settings
2011 plays